Coin is an unincorporated community in Brunswick Township, Kanabec County, Minnesota, United States.

Kanabec County Road 4 (103rd Avenue) and Kanabec County Road 16 (King Road) are two of the main routes in the community.  Nearby places include Braham, Mora, Brunswick, Lewis Lake, Stanchfield, and Cranberry Wildlife Management Area.

ZIP codes 55006 (Braham) and 55051 (Mora) meet near Coin.

Stanchfield Brook–Ties Creek flows through the community.  State Highway 65 (MN 65) is nearby.

Coin is located in section 35 of Brunswick Township, which earlier had a post office from 1898 to 1904.  The name Coin was suggested by Ole E. Olson, the storekeeper and postmaster, during the William Jennings Bryan debate of Free Silver in 1896.

The boundary line between Kanabec and Isanti counties is near Coin.

References

 Official State of Minnesota Highway Map – 2013/2014 edition

Unincorporated communities in Minnesota
Unincorporated communities in Kanabec County, Minnesota